Saint-Nicolas-de-Port is a commune in the Meurthe-et-Moselle département in north-eastern France.

The town's basilica, Saint Nicolas, is a pilgrimage site, supposedly holding relics of Saint Nicholas brought from Italy. It is one of France's Monuments historiques, and a minor basilica since 1950.

The town's inhabitants are known as Portois. In the past, the Portois were known as loudmouths; their neighbours across the Meurthe at Varangéville liked to gather on the opposite river bank to bombard them with a chorus indicating a wish to defecate in their mouths:
Booyaî d'Senn 'Colais,
Tend tet ghieule quand je...
which in the local Lorrain dialect means:
Loudmouths of St Nicks,
Open your gob when I'm taking a...

St Nicholas-de-Port is also known for fossil remains of very early (late Triassic) ancestral mammals.

Population

See also
Communes of the Meurthe-et-Moselle department

References

Saintnicolasdeport
Duchy of Lorraine